Jeffrey Boborol Galero (born 15 November 1990) is a Filipino professional boxer who challenged for the WBC mini-flyweight title in 2015.

Professional career
Galero challenged for his first world title on February 5, 2015, against WBC mini-flyweight champion Wanheng Menayothin, but lost by unanimous decision.

Professional boxing record

References

External links

Living people
Mini-flyweight boxers
Light-flyweight boxers
Flyweight boxers
Filipino male boxers
Boxers from Misamis Oriental
Sportspeople from Cagayan de Oro
1990 births